Gaspare dell'Acqua (active circa 1460) was an Italian painter of the Renaissance period, active mainly in Genoa and Pavia.

He was born in Lodi, Lombardy, and is known to have been in Genoa working with Niccolò Corso of Corsica.

References

Year of birth unknown
Year of death unknown
15th-century Italian painters
Italian male painters
People from Lodi, Lombardy
Painters from Genoa
Renaissance painters